Gonzalo Gastón Freitas Silva (born 2 October 1991) is a Uruguayan professional footballer who plays as a midfielder for Liga MX club  Mazatlán, on loan from Peñarol.

Career
Freitas' senior career started with Bella Vista of the Uruguayan Primera División. He made his professional debut in the 2011 Copa Sudamericana, it came in a first stage first leg against Universidad Católica on 2 August. His league debut came just over a month later in a home loss to Cerrito. He made thirteen appearances in his debut season. Twenty-four followed in the following season, 2012–13, as well as two goals, including his career first versus Progreso on 29 September 2012. Bella Vista were relegated in 2012–13, Freitas subsequently joined top-flight Liverpool. He played twenty-one times as they were relegated.

In the Uruguayan Segunda División, Freitas scored five goals in twenty-four games as Liverpool won the title and promotion back to the Primera División. Three goals in fifty-three matches followed in the next three seasons with Liverpool in the top-flight. On 18 July 2017, Freitas left Uruguayan football to join Argentine Primera División side Atlético Tucumán on loan. He returned to Liverpool a year later but was soon sold to Peñarol. Freitas was loaned to the Chilean Primera División's Everton in January 2019.

Personal life
Freitas' brother, Nicolás, is also a footballer.

Career statistics
.

Honours
Liverpool
Uruguayan Segunda División: 2014–15

Peñarol
Uruguayan Primera División: 2018

References

External links

1991 births
Living people
Footballers from Montevideo
Uruguayan footballers
Association football midfielders
C.A. Bella Vista players
Liverpool F.C. (Montevideo) players
Atlético Tucumán footballers
Peñarol players
Everton de Viña del Mar footballers
C.D. Antofagasta footballers
Uruguayan Primera División players
Uruguayan Segunda División players
Argentine Primera División players
Uruguayan expatriate footballers
Uruguayan expatriate sportspeople in Argentina
Uruguayan expatriate sportspeople in Chile
Expatriate footballers in Argentina
Expatriate footballers in Chile